Brian Byrne (born 11 June 1956) is an Irish boxer. He competed in the men's light middleweight event at the 1976 Summer Olympics.

References

External links
 

1956 births
Living people
Irish male boxers
Olympic boxers of Ireland
Boxers at the 1976 Summer Olympics
Place of birth missing (living people)
Light-middleweight boxers